Monofenestrata is an unranked group of pterosaurs that includes the family Wukongopteridae and the suborder Pterodactyloidea.

The clade Monofenestrata was in 2009/2010 defined as the group consisting of Pterodactylus and all species sharing with Pterodactylus the synapomorphy of an external nostril confluent with the antorbital fenestra, the major skull opening on the side of the snout. The name is derived from Greek monos, "single", and Latin fenestra, "window". The concept was inspired by the discovery of Darwinopterus, a species combining a pterodactyloid-type skull with a more basal build of the remainder of the body. The Darwinoptera, a primitive subgroup of monofenestratans showing this transitional anatomy, was also named for Darwinopterus and defined as all descendants of its common ancestor with Pterorhynchus.

The earliest known monofenestratan fossils have been found in the Stonesfield Slate formation of the United Kingdom, which dates to the Bathonian stage of the Middle Jurassic, dated to about 166 million years ago. Identified elements include cervical vertebrae, fourth metacarpals and a possible pterodactyloid synsacrum. 

Below is a cladogram showing the results of a phylogenetic analysis presented by Andres, Clark & Xu, 2014. This study found the two traditional groupings of ctenochasmatoids and kin as an early branching group (represented as the group Archaeopterodactyloidea), with all other pterodactyloids grouped into the Eupterodactyloidea.

References

 
Callovian first appearances
Maastrichtian extinctions